Indirect presidential elections were held in the Czech Republic on 8–9 February 2008, in which Parliament elected the President. The candidates standing for election were the incumbent president Václav Klaus and University of Michigan Professor  Jan Švejnar.

When no winner emerged on the first ballot, another ballot was held on 15 February 2008, with Klaus narrowly elected for a second term. The election was marked by party splits and post-Cold War rancor, Germany's Deutsche Welle reported. He signed his presidential pledge with a platinum-plated pen allegedly worth up to 1 million koruna (about US$61,300). A Czech company had donated the pen, one of a limited edition of 10, to Klaus, who promised he would exercise his powers cautiously and conservatively during his second term.

Electoral system

The indirect election could be held over a maximum of three rounds with gradually relaxing requirements for election.
The differences of the 2008 election against the earlier ones were:
 Compared to the 2003 election, the balance of power between both chambers switched: Klaus' party had an absolute majority in the Senate, cemented by pro-Klaus senators from smaller parties.
 For the first time there were only two candidates, so no elimination between first and second round.
 Due to absences of MPs, the quorum for election was decreased 140.

In the 2008 election, the President came of the 3rd round of the second election, in 2003 it took one election more.

Background
Klaus was nominated for the second term by the 122 MPs and senators belonging to his Civic Democratic Party on 28 November 2007. Jan Švejnar, a US-based economist originally from the Czech Republic, stated he would announce in early December whether he will run against Klaus, with the support of former president Václav Havel, the Czech Social Democratic Party and the Green Party, as well as the caucuses of Association of Independent Lists (SNK) and the Open Democracy in the Senate of the Czech Republic which unite independent and liberal Senators from a range of small parties. The Communist Party of Bohemia and Moravia was considering supporting him, as well. Christian and Democratic Union – Czechoslovak People's Party (KDU–ČSL) were unable to unite on a candidate, and remained undecided even after holding talks with Klaus, but they support (together with the ČSSD and the Green Party) a constitutional amendment to have direct presidential elections instead (though such an amendment would only apply from the next election in 2013 onwards). Most analysts assumed that Klaus would win re-election.

The KSČM was to decide on 7 December 2007 whether to support Švejnar, and the ČSSD required substantial cross-party support by 8 December 2007 to turn their conditional support for him into definite support. However, the KSČM interrupted the discussions supporting Švejnar on 7 December 2007, wanting reassurances from the ČSSD that they would indeed support Švejnar, fearing that their support for Švejnar might be moot if the ČSSD was not united on this. Both Klaus and Švejnar are vied for the support of the KDU–ČSL. Švejnar announced on 8 December 2007 that his bid was still alive and that he would decide whether to run in the coming week, depending on the level of support from major parties. On 11 December 2007 the press stated that he had acquired the support of five analysts and experts to assist him in his bid for the presidency. Švejnar himself announced that he would decide on whether he'd run only in the week afterwards, as political parties were still holding talks to decide on whether to support him.

The KSČM has stated that they have set five conditions necessary for them to support a candidate in the election, and that both of the candidates fulfil some of the conditions; however, they stated that Švejnar should renounce his US citizenship. Švejnar later stated he would renounce his US citizenship if elected.

The ČSSD announced their official support for Švejnar on 15 December 2007.

As the president is elected by an absolute majority of MPs and senators, Klaus only needs 19 votes from other parties to win re-election.
In a mid-December public opinion poll, Švejnar gained in popularity and was tied with Klaus.

While it was not considered certain whether Švejnar even wanted to run, a serious and emotional debate over who contributed more to the economic reforms at the start of the 1990s between Klaus and Švejnar was read by analysts as a sign that Švejnar did indeed want to run for the office. By 12 December 2007, he had gathered the necessary ten signatures from MPs or senators required to run for president; among the lawmakers nominating him were Senate deputy chairman Petr Pithart from KDU–ČSL, head of the ČSSD senators' group Alena Gajdušková and Soňa Paukertová, head of the Caucus of Open Democracy in the Senate.

Švejnar proposed a public debate with Klaus, but Klaus rejected on the grounds that Klaus did not need the publicity and that it would only help Švejnar; the ČSSD strongly criticised Klaus' decision. According to polls, 43% prefer Klaus as president, while 28% would prefer Švejnar and 29% are undecided.

The former foreign minister Jiří Dienstbier had also been suggested by some Social Democrats and Communists as a possible anti-Klaus candidate.

ČSSD reportedly considering different options to ensure that none of their MPs vote for Klaus against the party line: to have an open ballot, to have voting done by two MPs at a time or to have the MPs make photos with their mobile phones as proof of their vote.

Former president Václav Havel officially announced his support for Švejnar on 1 January 2008.

There are rumours that KDU–ČSL are offering full support to Klaus in exchange for Jiří Čunek becoming a government minister again. Foreign minister Karel Schwarzenberg has unequivocally stated he will resign if Čunek enters the government again after his resignation in late 2007, and the Greens have also stated they are against this.

KSČM is almost certain to support Švejnar in the first round, to ensure that Klaus is not the only candidate who passes to the second round, but it has not officially decided on whom to support in later rounds.

According to polls from early January 2008, in a direct election Švejnar would beat Klaus with 52% to 48%. Polls from late January 2008 saw Švejnar increase his lead to 55% against Klaus' 45%. Other polls favored Klaus in a direct election. According to Palacký University Klaus would gain 51% to Švejnar's 49. According to Median Klaus would win votes of 59% citizens. Credibility of polls was put in question when it was revealed that some polls were made on political request.

According to questions asked by the newspaper Mladá fronta Dnes, Klaus and Švejnar differ mostly on two points: Švejnar is in favor of introducing the Euro as quickly as possible and in favor of introducing direct presidential elections, while Klaus is against both. Each candidate also differs in the views on the economic transformation of the country after the Velvet Revolution and on the environmental issues. Klaus believes global warming is a hype, when Švejnar insists it is a dangerous threat to our planet.

All parties except for ODS agreed that the vote should be held publicly by acclamation (which they have the majority to decide in the lower house), threatening a blocking of the third round of the joint sitting can not agree on the election method in the third round. More than two-thirds of Czechs favor public elections.

Parties in parliament

Candidates and party support

The Civic Democratic Party and Christian and Democratic Union – Czechoslovak People's Party supported Klaus.

The Czech Social Democratic Party, the Green Party, the Caucus SNK and the Caucus of Open Democracy supported Švejnar.

KSČM was not fully decided whether to support Švejnar or not, while about half of the 26 deputies and 3 senators favored Klaus and Švejnar.

Three well-known Czech political analysts rated the chances of Klaus and Švejnar at 60–40, 70–30 and 95–5, respectively.

Opinion polls

Results

First attempt (8–9 February)
The joint session started on 8 February 2008 on 10:00 local time. As predicted, a lengthy debate on the election method delayed the election, but it was agreed after six hours of debate to have an open balloting. After two rounds of election, the session was adjourned at 21:00 as previously agreed and the election was postponed to 9 February 2008. The results for the second vote held on 8 February were announced on 9 February 2008.

Prior to the third round of the elections, three lawmakers left the joint session due to health issues: ČSSD deputy Evžen Snítilý and KDU-ČSL senators Josef Kalbáč and Karel Barták. Snítilý was thought to be in favour of Švejnar but supported Klaus in the second election of 15 February and was later expelled from the Social Democrat group, while both Kalbáč and Barták were in favour of Klaus. The third round also failed to produce a winner; the Communists abstained instead of voting for Švejnar, but Klaus fell one vote short of a majority of 140 of the 278 lawmakers present.

Second attempt (15 February)

The date for the second election was set to 15 February 2008. The second election also allows for the three rounds, with the same rules as the first election and both present candidates will be running. In the second election, communist party KSČM proposed an additional candidate – MEP and former TV anchorwoman Jana Bobošíková. She is known as an outspoken critic of the EU and of the planned US missile shield in Poland and the Czech Republic.

Two independent senators who had voted for Klaus, Liana Janáčková and Jana Juřenčáková, stated they had been threatened, and the ČSSD senator Evžen Snítilý who left the session in the third round of the first attempt, stated he wanted to leave the party (and was soon expelled). Reportedly, Snítilý suffered from threats and blackmail over his StB past.

The three nominees were Švejnar, Klaus and Bobošíková. Bobošíková was nominated by 17 KSČM deputies, but the Communists stated they would be inclined to support Švejnar under certain conditions.

Klaus' chances to be reelected were boosted when Snítilý announced he would vote for Klaus prior to the session. Surprisingly, in his address on 15 February 2008 before the joint session of parliament, Klaus stated he supported holding the presidential elections as public ballots and not as secret ballots as he demanded before. Klaus also delivered a significantly more nationalistic and euroskeptical speech than the week previously.  This was taken as an indication that he knew he had the votes to win and no longer needed to moderate his feelings.

Bobošíková withdrew her candidacy shortly after the debate and before the first round of voting citing a lack of support for her, boosting Švejnar's chances. The Communists then announced they would employ the same tactic as in the first attempt: They will support Švejnar in the first and second rounds, but abstain in the third round, thus trying to make the second attempt at electing a president a failure, as well.

After more debate on the method of voting, the ODS accepted holding the vote with public ballots again. Green MP Olga Zubová was absent from the session due to a surgical intervention she had some time ago.

In the first round of voting, Klaus received 141 votes, just enough for his reelection in the third round. The second round saw similar results, but also a drop in support for Švejnar by the Communists. Prior to the third round, it was reported that Minister for Human Rights and Minorities Džamila Stehlíková from the Greens was at the missing MP Zubová's residence, likely trying to get her to show up for the third round to improve Švejnar's chances.

In the third round Klaus was re-elected as President of the Czech Republic.

References

 
Presidential election
Indirect elections
2008
Czech presidential election

cs:Volby prezidenta České republiky (1993-2008)
ru:Выборы президента Чехии